"Holiday in Spain" is a song by American rock band Counting Crows from their fourth studio album, Hard Candy (2002), and later recorded as a duet with Dutch pop-rock group BLØF in 2004. This version features BLØF singing parts of the song in Dutch, whereas the parts performed by Counting Crows are sung in English. Regardless of language changes, the lyrics remain consistent throughout the song. The duet version is included on BLØF's 2004 compilation album, Het eind van het begin.

Released as a single in Europe on May 28, 2004, the duet became a platinum-selling hit in the Netherlands, reaching number one on both the Dutch Top 40 and the Single Top 100 charts. The three CD singles released feature additional Counting Crows songs that were recorded live at Rotterdam Ahoy on March 10, 2004, including "Mr. Jones", "Daylight Fading", and "Hanginaround". The original version of the song also appears on Counting Crows' compilation album Films About Ghosts (The Best Of...) (2003).

Track listings
All live tracks were recorded on March 10, 2004, at Ahoy, Holland.

European CD1
 "Holiday in Spain" (with BLØF)
 "Good Time" (live at Ahoy, Holland)
 "Mr. Jones" (live at Ahoy, Holland)
 "Round Here" (live at Ahoy, Holland)

European CD2
 "Holiday in Spain" (with BLØF)
 "Rain King" (live at Ahoy, Holland)
 "St. Robinson in His Cadillac Dream" (live at Ahoy, Holland)
 "Hanginaround" (live at Ahoy, Holland)

European CD3
 "Holiday in Spain" (with BLØF)
 "Daylight Fading" (live at Ahoy, Holland)
 "Hard Candy" (live at Ahoy, Holland)
 "Holiday in Spain" (with BLØF live at Ahoy, Holland)

Credits and personnel

Original version
Credits are adapted from the Hard Candy booklet.

Studios
 Recorded at Ocean Way Recording (Hollywood, California) and Westside Studios (London, England)
 Mastered at Gateway Mastering (Portland, Maine, US)

Counting Crows
 Adam F. Duritz – words, music, vocals, piano, string sampler
 Dan Vickrey – electric and acoustic guitars, banjo, vocals
 Ben Mize – drums, percussion, loops, vocals
 Matt Malley – bass guitar, upright bass, vocals
 David Immerglück – electric and acoustic guitars, mandolin, bass, vocals
 Charles Gillingham – piano, other keys, synthesizer, vocals
 David Bryson – electric and acoustic guitars, vocals

Other personnel
 Steve Lillywhite – production
 Cindi Peters – production coordination
 Jack Joseph Puig – mixing
 Carl Glanville – recording
 Bob Ludwig – mastering

Duet version
Credits are adapted from the European CD2 liner notes.

Studios
 Recorded in March 2004 at Wisseloord Studios (Hilversum, Netherlands)
 Mixed at Down Under Studio (Hilversum, Netherlands)
 Mastered at Q Point Digital Audio (Hilversum, Netherlands)

Personnel

 Adam F. Duritz – words, music
 Peter Slager – words
 Counting Crows – production
 BLØF – production

 Holger Schwedt – recording, engineering, mixing
 Arjen Mensinga – additional engineering
 Marty Brugmans – additional engineering
 Peter Brussee – mastering

Charts

Weekly charts

Year-end charts

Decade-end charts

Certifications

Release history

References

2002 songs
2004 singles
Counting Crows songs
Dutch Top 40 number-one singles
Geffen Records singles
Macaronic songs
Song recordings produced by Steve Lillywhite
Songs about Spain
Songs written by Adam Duritz